Hunt Hawkins is an American poet. He graduated from Williams College, Phi Beta Kappa, and from Stanford University. He taught at Florida State University.  He teaches at University of South Florida. His work appears in Apalachee Quarterly, Georgia Review, Minnesota Review, Poetry, Southern Review, TriQuarterly. Hawkins was the 1992 recipient of the Agnes Lynch Starrett Poetry Prize.

Works

Non-fiction

Poetry
 
 A New Geography of Poetry (University of Arkansas Press, 1992)

References

Year of birth missing (living people)
Living people
Agnes Lynch Starrett Poetry Prize winners
American male poets
Williams College alumni
Stanford University alumni
Florida State University faculty
University of South Florida faculty